The 1920 Illinois gubernatorial election was held on November 2, 1920.

Incumbent first-term Republican Governor Frank Orren Lowden declined to stand for re-election. He was an unsuccessful candidate for the Republican nomination for U.S. President at the 1920 Republican National Convention.

Republican nominee Len Small defeated Democratic nominee James Hamilton Lewis with 58.78% of the vote.

Primary elections
Primary elections were held on September 15, 1920.

Democratic primary

Candidates
James Hamilton Lewis, former U.S. Senator
Barratt O'Hara, former Lieutenant Governor

Results

Republican primary

Candidates
Oscar E. Carlstrom, Mercer County state's attorney
John G. Oglesby, incumbent Lieutenant Governor
Len Small, former State Treasurer
Edward N. Woodruff, mayor of Peoria

Results

Socialist primary

Candidates
Andrew Lafin

Results

General election

Candidates

Major candidates
Len Small, Republican		
James Hamilton Lewis, Democratic

Minor candidates
Harrison Parker, Co-operative, former president of the Chicago-American Newspaper Company
John H. Walker, Farmer-Labor, national Chairman of the Farmer-Labor Party
John Maynard Harlan, Harding-Coolidge Republican, Independent nominee for mayor of Chicago 1897 and Republican nominee for mayor of Chicago in 1905
Parke Longworth, Liberal
James H. Woertendyke, Prohibition, Prohibition nominee for U.S. House in 1904 from Illinois's 13th congressional district
Lewis D. Spaulding, Single Tax
Andrew Lafin, Socialist, Socialist nominee for U.S. House in 1916 from Illinois's 9th congressional district
John M. Francis, Socialist Labor, nominee for Governor in 1916

Results

See also
1920 Illinois lieutenant gubernatorial election

References

Bibliography
 

1920
Illinois
Gubernatorial
November 1920 events in the United States